Đà Nẵng University of Science and Technology, is one of the most important universities of technology in Vietnam. 

It is a university member of the University of Đà Nẵng. The polytechnic university was founded in Đà Nẵng in 1976 and then had two divisions: an economic faculty and a technical faculty. When the University of Đà Nẵng was founded by incorporating several colleges in Đà Nẵng, the economic division was split off to establish Đà Nẵng University of Economics.

See also 
 Đà Nẵng University
 Đà Nẵng University of Economics

Universities in Da Nang